Butler is a masculine given name which is borne by:

 Butler Ames (1871–1954), American politician, engineer, soldier and businessman
 Butler B'ynote' (born 1972), American football player
 Butler Derrick (1936–2014), U.S. Representative from South Carolina
 Butler B. Hare (1875–1967), U.S. Representative from South Carolina
 Butler Lampson (born 1943), American computer scientist
 Butler D. Shaffer (1935–2019), American author, law professor and speaker

English-language masculine given names